Bash Khalaj (also Romanized as Bāsh Khalaj; also known as Bāsh Khalīj) is a village in Nazarkahrizi Rural District, Nazarkahrizi District, Hashtrud County, East Azerbaijan Province, Iran. At the 2006 census, its population was 135, in 26 families.

References 

Towns and villages in Hashtrud County